James R. Stoner Jr. (born January 4, 1955 in Washington D.C.) is Hermann Moyse Jr. Professor and Director of the Eric Voegelin Institute in the Department of Political Science at Louisiana State University.  Stoner specializes in political theory, English common law, and American constitutionalism.

Education 
Stoner graduated summa cum laude with an A.B. from Middlebury College in 1977, where he was a student of Murray Dry and Paul Nelson.  He obtained both his M.A. (1980) and Ph.D. (1987) from Harvard University, studying under professor Harvey Mansfield.

Career 
Before arriving at LSU in 1988, Stoner was an instructor in Politics and Public Policy at Goucher College.  He was a member of the National Council on Humanities until 2006, having been appointed to that post by George W. Bush in 2002. He is also a Senior Fellow of the Witherspoon Institute.

He contributed to the Princeton Principles, a policy paper released July 13, 2006 on the importance of "marriage and the public good." Additionally, Professor Stoner has authored two books: Common Law and Liberal Theory: Coke, Hobbes, and the Origins of American Constitutionalism, and Common Law Liberty: Rethinking American Constitutionalism. He has co-edited three books, Rethinking Business Management: Examining the Foundations of Business Education, The Social Costs of Pornography: A Collection of Papers, and The Thriving Society: On the Social Conditions of Human Flourishing, all three of which are collections of papers presented at conferences at Princeton University.

He has lectured, debated, or presented papers at a wide array of universities, including Harvard University, Princeton University, University of Virginia, Georgetown University, the United States Air Force Academy, Michigan State University, Boston College, Middlebury College, Bowdoin College, University of Richmond, Baylor University, Tulane University, Saginaw Valley State University, Salve Regina University, Loyola College of Maryland, Oglethorpe University, University of Alaska-Anchorage, Ave Maria University, St. Vincent College, Rochester Institute of Technology, Berry College, and the Catholic University of America, as well as at the law schools of Villanova University, University of Minnesota, Hamline University, University of St. Thomas, and University of Florida. Stoner served as acting Dean of the LSU Honors College for the Fall 2010 semester and chaired his department from 2007 to 2013.

Published works 
Books
 
 
  Republished, with several chapters dropped or added, as  
 
 

Book chapters
 
 
 
 

Articles

Book reviews

References

External links 

 Profile Page at LSU
 James Stoner on Rebuilding New Orleans
 James Stoner on the School Prayer Amendment
 

1955 births
American political scientists
Louisiana State University faculty
Middlebury College alumni
Harvard University alumni
Living people
Witherspoon Institute